The 1979 Open Championship was the 108th Open Championship, held 18–21 July at Royal Lytham & St Annes Golf Club in Lancashire, England. Seve Ballesteros, 22, won the first of his five major titles, three strokes ahead of runners-up Jack Nicklaus and Ben Crenshaw. It was the first of his three Open Championship victories; he raised the Claret Jug again in 1984 and 1988.

This was the last Open scheduled to end on Saturday; in 1980 it moved to a Sunday final round, similar to the other three majors.

Course

Hole #6 was a par 4 in 2012.

Lengths of the course for The Open Championship (since 1950):

 1974: , par 71   
 1969: , par 71
 1963: , par 70
 1958: , par 71   
 1952:

Past champions in the field

Made both cuts

Source:

Missed the first cut

Source:

Round summaries

First round
Wednesday, 18 July 1979

Source:

Second round
Thursday, 19 July 1979

Source:

Amateurs: McEvoy (+3), Player (+8), Hallberg (+14), Hoad (+15),Bennett (+17), Myers (+18), Guy (+20), Whelan (+23).

Third round
Friday, 20 July 1979

Amateurs: McEvoy (+4), Player (+19).

Final round
Saturday, 21 July 1979

Source:

Amateurs: McEvoy (+10)

References

External links
Royal Lytham & St Annes 1979 (Official site)
108th Open Championship - Royal Lytham & St Annes (European Tour)

The Open Championship
Golf tournaments in England
Open Championship
Open Championship
Open Championship